Joel Alberto Piñeiro (born September 25, 1978) is a Puerto Rican former professional baseball pitcher. He played in Major League Baseball (MLB) for the Seattle Mariners, Boston Red Sox, St. Louis Cardinals, and Los Angeles Angels of Anaheim. He officially retired after appearing on the 2017 World Baseball Classic roster for Puerto Rico.

Professional career

Seattle Mariners
Piñeiro began the  baseball season as a promising starting pitcher for the Seattle Mariners. The previous two years he started in 60 games, won a total of 30 games, and produced a 3.52  ERA. 2004 though, turned into a dismal year with Piñeiro posting a 4.67 ERA and the first losing record of his career (6 wins – 11 losses). Piñeiro suffered another problem when he was placed on the disabled list July 27, 2004, with a sore elbow and subsequently missed the remainder of the season.

He returned to the majors and started in 30 total games; however he was unable to return to his previous form and posted a 5.62 ERA for the year.

In , Piñeiro was pulled from the starting rotation again on August 26, and placed in the bullpen.  His 6.36 ERA was the highest in the major leagues.

Following the 2006 season, the Mariners declined to tender Piñeiro a contract offer, making him a free agent.

Boston Red Sox
On January 3, he reached an agreement for a one-year deal with the Boston Red Sox, where he struggled as a member of the bullpen. On July 22, he was designated for assignment in order to clear a roster spot for Jon Lester. Piñeiro cleared waivers and accepted an assignment with the Pawtucket Red Sox, Boston's Triple-A affiliate, where he returned to the starting rotation.

St. Louis Cardinals
On July 31, 2007, Piñeiro was traded to the St. Louis Cardinals, with cash considerations, for a player to be named later (minor league outfielder Sean Danielson).
 
In his debut start with the Cardinals on August 4 vs. the Washington Nationals, he pitched 5 innings, giving up 7 hits, 5 runs (4 earned), 2 walks, 2 strikeouts, 1 home run while taking his second loss of the year in the Cardinals 12–1 loss.

In his debut home start with the Cardinals on August 9 against the San Diego Padres, he out-pitched Chris Young, giving up only 4 hits, 0 runs, 0 walks, and earning 4 strikeouts, lowering his ERA to 4.50 for the year in winning his second game with the Cardinals in their 5–0 win.  For the rest of 2007, Piñeiro showed some flashes of promise but general inconsistency, finishing with a record of 6–4 and posting an earned run average of 3.96 for his new team.

2008 was a season typified by inconsistency and a trip to the DL, as Piñeiro allowed home runs and 180 hits in  IP, posting a 7–7 record and 5.15 ERA.  However, leading into 2009, Piñeiro reinvented his approach, utilizing a sinking fastball to pitch to contact and concede more ground balls, while limiting the number of home runs allowed. In 32 starts, Piñeiro posted a 15–12 record with a 3.49 ERA and led the major leagues with 1.1 walks per nine innings rate.

After the 2009 season, Piñeiro filed for free agency.

Los Angeles Angels of Anaheim
On January 22, 2010, Piñeiro signed a 2-year, $16 million deal with the Los Angeles Angels of Anaheim.

Because of Piñeiro's volatile performance before the 2009 season, critics were split on the deal, with most wondering whether his sinkerball would continue to be effective in 2010. Taking the sinkerball as starting point, Fangraph's Dave Allen thought, "the price was solid." Baseball Prospectus's Christina Kahrl pointed out the different starters that failed after leaving Cardinals pitching coach Dave Duncan's guiding hand. "There are so many unknowns that it makes the proposition that he'll deliver on this deal seem dubious", concluding "this just doesn't seem like it'll go well." Meanwhile, ESPN's Rob Neyer said quality was not so important as quantity: Piñeiro would be worth the contract if he would just pitch 200 innings per season. His first season was cut short due to injury, starting only 23 games. The following season was met with another trip to the disabled list. He finished 7-7 in 27 games (24 starts).

Philadelphia Phillies
On January 15, 2012, Piñeiro signed a minor league deal that included an invitation to Spring Training with the Philadelphia Phillies. Piñeiro was released on March 19, 2012, after just six innings in Spring Training.

Baltimore Orioles
Piñeiro signed a minor league contract with the Baltimore Orioles on April 11, 2012. Piñeiro did not pitch for their organization due to a shoulder injury.

Piñeiro re-signed with the Orioles for the 2013 season on a minor league contract.

Chicago Cubs
Piñeiro signed a minor league contract with the Chicago Cubs on April 1, 2014. On June 6, 2014, Piñeiro was released by the Cubs.

Second stint with the Angels
On June 7, 2014, Piñeiro signed a minor league deal to return to the Angels, less than a day after being released by the Cubs. He was released on June 30, 2014, after being suspended 50 games for testing positive for a banned stimulant.

Toronto Blue Jays
On May 9, 2015, Piñeiro signed a minor league contract with the Toronto Blue Jays. He was assigned to the Double-A New Hampshire Fisher Cats, and later the Triple-A Buffalo Bisons. In 13 appearances (11 starts), Piñeiro posted a 5–4 record, 4.23 ERA, and 35 strikeouts in 76 innings pitched. He was released on July 22.

Personal life
Piñeiro resides in Río Piedras, Puerto Rico with his wife Shirley and children Joel, Jr. (Born April 7, 2003), Juliana (born November 2, 2005), and twins Adrian & Fabian (born September 18, 2008).

See also
 List of Major League Baseball players from Puerto Rico

References

External links

Joel Pineiro's page at stlcardinals.scout.com

1978 births
Living people
People from Río Piedras, Puerto Rico
Seattle Mariners players
Boston Red Sox players
St. Louis Cardinals players
Los Angeles Angels players
2006 World Baseball Classic players
2017 World Baseball Classic players
Major League Baseball pitchers
Major League Baseball players from Puerto Rico
Arizona League Mariners players
Everett AquaSox players
Wisconsin Timber Rattlers players
Lancaster JetHawks players
Orlando Rays players
New Haven Ravens players
Tacoma Rainiers players
Lowell Spinners players
Pawtucket Red Sox players
Memphis Redbirds players
Inland Empire 66ers of San Bernardino players
Norfolk Tides players
Gulf Coast Orioles players
Tennessee Smokies players
New Hampshire Fisher Cats players
Buffalo Bisons (minor league) players
Colonial High School alumni
Florida SouthWestern Buccaneers baseball players